Lingbei may refer to the following locations in China:

 Lingbei, Suixi (岭北镇), in Suixi County, Guangdong
 Lingbei, Xiangyin (岭北镇), in Xiangyin County, Hunan
 Lingbei, Hegang (岭北街道), in Xingshan District, Hegang, Heilongjiang
 Lingbei, Yangshan (岭背镇), in Yangshan County, Guangdong
 Lingbei, Lingyuan (凌北街道), in Lingyuan, Liaoning
 Lingbei province (岭北行省) during the Yuan dynasty